is a former Japanese football player.

Club statistics

References

External links

J. League (#27)

1992 births
Living people
Association football people from Tokyo
Japanese footballers
J1 League players
J2 League players
Ventforet Kofu players
Giravanz Kitakyushu players
Association football forwards